Ranked pairs (sometimes abbreviated "RP") or the Tideman method is an electoral system developed in 1987 by Nicolaus Tideman that selects a single winner using votes that express preferences. The ranked-pairs procedure can also be used to create a sorted list of winners.

If there is a candidate who is preferred over the other candidates, when compared in turn with each of the others, the ranked-pairs procedure guarantees that candidate will win. Because of this property, the ranked-pairs procedure complies with the Condorcet winner criterion (and is a Condorcet method).

Procedure 

The ranked-pairs procedure operates as follows:
 Tally the vote count comparing each pair of candidates, and determine the winner of each pair (provided there is not a tie)
 Sort (rank) each pair, by strength of victory, from largest first to smallest last.
 "Lock in" each pair, starting with the one with the largest strength of victory and, continuing through the sorted pairs, add each one in turn to a graph if it does not create a cycle in the graph with the existing locked in pairs. The completed graph shows the final ranking.

The procedure can be illustrated using a simple example.

Tally 

Notice the skew symmetry of the table.

Sort 
The positive majorities are then sorted in decreasing order of magnitude.

Lock 
The next stage is to examine the majorities in turn to determine which pairs to "lock in". These preferences are decided by the list of sorted majorities, simply skipping over any which are inconsistent with previous decisions.

Once these facts have been incorporated into the table it takes the form as shown after two steps. Notice again the skew symmetry.

Winner 
In the resulting graph for the locked pairs, the source corresponds to the winner. In this case  is preferred to all other candidates and is therefore identified as the winner.

Tied majorities 
In the example the majorities are all different, and this is what will usually happen when the number of voters is large. If ties are unlikely, then it does not matter much how they are resolved, so a random choice can be made. However this is not Tideman's procedure, which is considerably more complicated. See his paper for details.

An example

The situation 

The results would be tabulated as follows:

 [A] indicates voters who preferred the candidate listed in the column caption to the candidate listed in the row caption
 [B] indicates voters who preferred the candidate listed in the row caption to the candidate listed in the column caption

Tally 
First, list every pair, and determine the winner:

Note that absolute counts of votes can be used, or
percentages of the total number of votes; it makes no difference since it is the ratio of votes between two candidates that matters.

Sort 
The votes are then sorted.
The largest majority is "Chattanooga over Knoxville"; 83% of the
voters prefer Chattanooga. Thus, the pairs from above would be sorted this way:

Lock 
The pairs are then locked in order, skipping any pairs
that would create a cycle:

 Lock Chattanooga over Knoxville.
 Lock Nashville over Knoxville.
 Lock Nashville over Chattanooga.
 Lock Nashville over Memphis.
 Lock Chattanooga over Memphis.
 Lock Knoxville over Memphis.

In this case, no cycles are created by any of the
pairs, so every single one is locked in.

Every "lock in" would add another arrow to the
graph showing the relationship between the candidates.
Here is the final graph (where arrows point away from
the winner).

In this example, Nashville is the winner using the ranked-pairs procedure.  Nashville is followed by Chattanooga, Knoxville, and Memphis in second, third, and fourth places respectively.

Summary 
In the example election, the winner is Nashville. This would be true for any Condorcet method.

Using the First-past-the-post voting and some other systems, Memphis would have won the election by having the most people, even though Nashville won every simulated pairwise election outright. Using Instant-runoff voting in this example would result in Knoxville winning even though more people preferred Nashville over Knoxville.

Criteria 
Of the formal voting criteria, the ranked pairs method passes the majority criterion, the monotonicity criterion, the Smith criterion (which implies the Condorcet criterion), the Condorcet loser criterion, and the independence of clones criterion. Ranked pairs fails the consistency criterion and the participation criterion. While ranked pairs is not fully independent of irrelevant alternatives, it still satisfies local independence of irrelevant alternatives.

Independence of irrelevant alternatives 
Ranked pairs fails independence of irrelevant alternatives. However, the method adheres to a less strict property, sometimes called independence of Smith-dominated alternatives (ISDA). It says that if one candidate (X) wins an election, and a new alternative (Y) is added, X will win the election if Y is not in the Smith set. ISDA implies the Condorcet criterion.

Comparison table 
The following table compares Ranked Pairs with other preferential single-winner election methods:

Notes

References

External links 
 Descriptions of ranked-ballot voting methods by Rob LeGrand
 Example JS implementation by Asaf Haddad
 Pair Ranking Ruby Gem by Bala Paranj
 A margin-based PHP Implementation of Tideman's Ranked Pairs
 Rust implementation of Ranked Pairs by Cory Dickson

Electoral systems
Monotonic Condorcet methods
Single-winner electoral systems